
Gmina Zarzecze is a rural gmina (administrative district) in Przeworsk County, Subcarpathian Voivodeship, in south-eastern Poland.

Villages
Gmina Zarzecze contains the villages and settlements of Kisielów, Łapajówka, Maćkówka, Parcelacja Rożniatowska, Pełnatycze, Rożniatów, Siennów, Zalesie Żurowskie, Zarzecze and Żurawiczki.

Neighbouring gminas
Gmina Zarzecze is bordered by the town of Przeworsk and by the gminas of Kańczuga, Pawłosiów, Pruchnik, Przeworsk and Roźwienica.

References

Polish official population figures 2006

Zarzecze
Przeworsk County